A Slavic name suffix is a common way of forming patronymics, family names, and pet names in the Slavic languages. Many, if not most, Slavic last names are formed by adding possessive and other suffixes to given names and other words. Most Slavic surnames have suffixes which are found in varying degrees over the different nations. Some surnames are not formed in this way, including names of non-Slavic origin. They are also seen in North America, Argentina, and Australia.

An example using an occupation is kovač, koval or kowal, which means blacksmith.  It is the root of the names Kovačević, Kovačić, Kowalski, Kowalchuk, Kowalczyk, Kovachev, Kovalenko, Kovalyov, and Kovalev.  All mean "descendant of a blacksmith".

The given name Petr, Petro or Petar (equivalent to Peter) can become Petrov, Petriv, Petriw, Petrenko, Petrovsky, Petrović, Petrić, Petrič, Petrich, etc.  All mean "descendant of Peter".  This is similar to the use of "-son" or "-sen" in Germanic languages.

In East Slavic languages (Belarusian, Russian, Rusyn, and Ukrainian) the same system of name suffixes can be used to express several meanings.  One of the most common is the patronymic.  Instead of a secondary "middle" given name, people identify themselves with their given and family name and patronymic, a name based on their father's given name.  If a man gives his full name as Boris Vladimirovich Kuznetsov, then his father's name must have been Vladimir. Vladimirovich literally means "Vladimir's [son]".

Similarly, many suffixes can be attached to express affection or informality (in linguistics, called a diminutive).  For example, calling a boy named Ivan "Ivanko", "Ivo", "Ivica" etc, or Yuri "Yurko", expresses that he is familiar to you. This is the same as referring to Robert as "Rob," "Bob" and "Bobby"; or William as "Bill", "Will" and "Willy".

See also 

 Ashkenazi Jewish surnames
 Belarusian name
 Bosnian name
Bulgarian names
 Croatian name
Czech names
Polish names
Russian names
 Serbian names
 Slovak name
 Ukrainian name
 Slavic names

References 

Name suffixes
Slavic culture
 
Slavic-language names